Fire It Up may refer to:
 Fire It Up (Rick James album), 1979, and the title track
 Fire It Up (EP), a 1993 EP by Kid Rock
 Fire It Up (Tinsley Ellis album), 1997
 Fire It Up (Kottonmouth Kings album), 2004
 "Fire It Up" (Black Label Society song), 2005
 "Turn It Up" (Remix)/"Fire It Up", a 1998 rap song from rapper Busta Rhymes
 "Fire It Up" (Thousand Foot Krutch song)
 Fire It Up (Modest Mouse song), 2007
 Fire It Up (X-Sinner album), 2006
 Fire It Up (Johnny Reid album), 2012
 "Fire It Up" (Johnny Reid song), the title track
 Fire It Up (Joe Cocker album), 2012
 Fire It Up (Steve Cropper album), 2021
 Fire It Up, album by Gord Bamford, 2023
 "Fire It Up", a song by Disturbed from the band's 2015 album Immortalized
 "Fire It Up", a song by Jonah Prill which represented Montana in the American Song Contest